The members of the 19th Manitoba Legislature were elected in the Manitoba general election held in June 1932. The legislature sat from February 14, 1933, to June 12, 1936.

A coalition between the Progressive Party of Manitoba led by John Bracken and the Liberal Party led by Murdoch Mackay formed the government. Bracken served as premier.

Fawcett Taylor of the Conservatives was Leader of the Opposition. After Taylor resigned in 1933, William Sanford Evans became party leader.

The Minimum Wage Act was amended to include male workers over the age of 18. The minimum hourly wage in Manitoba was $0.25 for urban workers and $0.21 for rural workers. Up until 1931, the minimum wage only applied to female workers.

Philippe Adjutor Talbot served as speaker for the assembly.

There were four sessions of the 19th Legislature:

James Duncan McGregor was Lieutenant Governor of Manitoba until December 1, 1934, when William Johnston Tupper became lieutenant governor.

Members of the Assembly 
The following members were elected to the assembly in 1932:

Notes:

By-elections 
By-elections were held to replace members for various reasons:

Notes:

References 

Terms of the Manitoba Legislature
1933 establishments in Manitoba
1936 disestablishments in Manitoba